Gareth Alan Johnson (born 12 October 1969) is a British politician and former lawyer who served as Parliamentary Under-Secretary of State for Courts from September to October 2022. A member of the Conservative Party, he previously served as a Lord Commissioner of the Treasury from February to September 2022 and Assistant Government Whip from 2018 to 2019 and 2021 to 2022. Johnson was first elected at the 2010 general election as the Member of Parliament (MP) for Dartford, winning the seat from Labour. He has been supportive of Leave Means Leave, a Eurosceptic pressure group.

Early life and career
Johnson was born in Bromley on 12 October 1969, the son of a milkman. He attended Dartford Grammar School. Before entering politics, Johnson worked in the Magistrates Court Service and as a solicitor in Dartford. He served for a time on the Board of Governors of Dartford Grammar School for Girls.

Political career 
In local elections Johnson stood unsuccessfully as the Conservative candidate in the Danson ward of the London Borough of Bexley in 1994, before being elected in the Christchurch ward in 1998. He served one term of four years and did not stand for re-election in 2002. He served as Constituency chairman for the Conservative Party in Bexley.

In the 2001 general election Johnson unsuccessfully stood in the Labour-held seat of Lewisham West in London; the Conservative Party suffered a swing of 0.6% against it. He was unsuccessful again when he stood in Dartford at the 2005 general election, but this time achieved a swing in his favour of 0.5%. However, standing again in Dartford at the 2010 general election, Johnson was elected as Member of Parliament (MP), winning the seat from Labour with a 10,628 majority.

In the 2014 reshuffle he became PPS to David Gauke, newly promoted Financial Secretary to the Treasury.

In the 2015 general election, Johnson retained his seat and increased his majority to 12,345. Following the election, he was made PPS to Matt Hancock, Paymaster General of the Cabinet Office.

Johnson is listed as being the chair of the All Party Parliamentary Group on the Dominican Republic in December 2015. He previously served as the vice-chairman of both the Retail APPG and the British Sikhs APPG. Johnson has also previously been a member of both the Child and Youth Crime APPG and the BBC APPG.
In January 2016, Johnson led a Westminster Hall debate on congestion at the Dartford Crossing.

Johnson has previously served on the Justice Select Committee, the Human Rights (Joint Committee) and the Science and Technology Select Committee. Since the 27 June 2017, he has served as Parliamentary Private Secretary to the Secretary of State for Exiting the European Union.

He was re-elected at the 2017 general election, with an increased majority of 13,186.

He was appointed Assistant Government Whip in November 2018, resigning on 14 January 2019 in disagreement with Prime Minister Theresa May's policy for Britain leaving the European Union.

Johnson was re-elected at the 2019 General Election, with an increased majority of 19,160.

Following this, he served as Parliamentary Private Secretary to the First Secretary of State and Foreign Secretary Dominic Raab.

He was appointed Assistant Government Whip in the September 2021 cabinet reshuffle. On 9 February 2022, he was appointed Lord Commissioner of the Treasury, succeeding Craig Whittaker.

He endorsed Liz Truss in the July–September 2022 Conservative Party leadership election.

On 20 September 2022, he was appointed Parliamentary Under-Secretary of State for Justice in the Ministry of Justice by Prime Minister Liz Truss.

He endorsed Boris Johnson in the October 2022 Conservative Party Leadership Election, but he did not end up standing.

On 27 October, he was dismissed by Prime Minister Rishi Sunak.

Personal life 
Johnson lives in the village of Hartley with his wife Wendy and their two children.

Johnson employs his wife as a part-time Parliamentary Assistant on a salary up to £25,000. He was listed in a 2015 article in The Daily Telegraph criticising the practice of MPs employing family members, on the lines that it promotes nepotism. Although MPs who were first elected in 2017 have been banned from employing family members, the restriction is not retrospective – meaning that Johnson's employment of his wife is lawful.

Notes

References

External links 
Gareth Johnson MP  Official constituency website
Gareth Johnson MP  Conservative Party profile
Gareth Johnson on Facebook Facebook page

1969 births
Alumni of The University of Law
Living people
People from Bromley
Conservative Party (UK) MPs for English constituencies
UK MPs 2010–2015
UK MPs 2015–2017
UK MPs 2017–2019
UK MPs 2019–present